Since I Found You is a 2018 Philippine drama television series starring Piolo Pascual, Arci Muñoz, JC de Vera, Alessandra de Rossi and Empoy. The series premiered on ABS-CBN's Primetime Bida evening block and worldwide via The Filipino Channel from April 16 to August 10, 2018, replacing The Good Son. It was replaced by Halik.

Premise
Nathan Capistrano (Piolo Pascual) is the 40-year-old CEO of Golden Builders, Inc. He is a straight
shooter who goes after what he wants no matter the cost or the obstacles, and accepts no excuse from
anybody – not even his loved ones.

This ruthless and uncompromising outlook comes from the fact that Nathan faced the hardships of life at
an early age. He grew up poor, rising from poverty without anyone helping or supporting him. But despite
his current wealth and success, he is quick to realize that it is lonely at the top – and it is frustrating.

This is when he meets Dani Cobarrubias (Arci Muñoz), a spunky and outspoken 20-something who
Nathan eventually views as a kindred spirit. He allows himself to fall in love with her, and everything
seems to be perfect between them.

Cast and characters

Main cast
Piolo Pascual as Nathaniel "Nathan" Capistrano
Arci Muñoz as Daniella "Dani" Cobarrubias-Capistrano
Alessandra de Rossi as Janice Punzalan
JC de Vera as John "Gino" Corpuz
Empoy Marquez as James Ribs

Supporting cast
Michael de Mesa as Gary Corpuz
Carmi Martin as Regina "Mama Reg" Cobarrubias
Joey Marquez as Gregorio "Mang Gerry" Punzalan
John Lapus as Kap. Ronwaldo "Watashi" Cobarrubias
Isabel Oli-Prats as Alliya "Iya" Capistrano-Samontina
Cholo Barretto as Justin Capistrano
Kate Alejandrino as Lexie Capistrano
Vivoree Esclito as AJ Punzalan
Moi Marcampo as Morisette
Benj Manalo as Hector
Joel Saracho as Berto

Guest cast
Jong Cuenco as Irwin
Ces Quesada as Linda
Chrome Cosio as Darwin Samontina
Yñigo Delen as Kyle
CK Kieron as Kiefer
Gee Canlas as Racquel
Miho Nishida as Maggie
Ashley Sarmiento as Princess
Rhed Bustamante as Gelai
Justine Peña as  Moymoy
Young JV as Simon
Josef Elizalde as Jeff
Adrienne Vergara as Aida
Des Ngo as Lorna
Phi Palmos as Yellow
Max Celada as Bong
Dolly de Leon as Dr. Yambao
Lao Rodriguez as Engr. Landicho
Dwaine Woolley as Cole
Kyla as herself
Angelo Acosta as Adrian

Special participation
Charo Santos-Concio as Elvira "Elvie" Capistrano
Iza Calzado as Pam
Irma Adlawan as Tyang

Reception

See also
List of programs broadcast by ABS-CBN
List of ABS-CBN drama series

References

External links

ABS-CBN drama series
Philippine romantic comedy television series
2018 Philippine television series debuts
2018 Philippine television series endings
Television series by Dreamscape Entertainment Television
Filipino-language television shows
Television shows filmed in the Philippines